Hinduism is a minority religion in Turkey. It's the sixth largest religion in the country after Islam, Christianity, Judaism, Tengrism and Yazidism. As of 2010, there were 728 (0.001%) Hindus in Turkey.

Demographics
 

In 2001, 300 Hindus resided in Turkey. The number had reached 728 by 2010, an increase of 143 percent.

References

Turkey
Turkey
Religion in Turkey
Turkey